The 1993 Men's African Volleyball Championship was in Algiers, Algeria, with 10 teams participating in the continental championship.

Teams

Final ranking

References
 Men Volleyball Africa Championship 1993 Algiers (ALG)

1993 Men
African championship, Men
Men's African Volleyball Championship
1993 in Algerian sport
International volleyball competitions hosted by Algeria